Ab Zahlu (also Romanized as Āb Zahlū; also known as Āb Zahlī) is a village in Susan-e Gharbi Rural District, Susan District, Izeh County, Khuzestan Province, Iran. At the 2006 census, its population was 123, in 17 families.

References 

Populated places in Izeh County